First Evangelical Lutheran Church may refer to:

First Evangelical Lutheran Church (Fort Smith, Arkansas), listed on the US National Register of Historic Places (NRHP)
First Evangelical Lutheran Church (Gypsum, Colorado), NRHP-listed
First Evangelical Lutheran Church (Galveston, Texas), NRHP-listed in Galveston County, Texas
First Evangelical Lutheran Church of Toronto, Ontario, Canada

See also
First Lutheran Church (disambiguation)